Yennai Arindhaal is the soundtrack album for the 2015 Indian Tamil-language action thriller film of the same name, co-written and directed by Gautham Vasudev Menon, starring Ajith Kumar, Arun Vijay, Anushka Shetty, Trisha, Parvathy Nair and Vivek in the lead roles, while Anikha, Ashish Vidyarthi, Suman and Avinash playing the pivotal roles. The soundtrack album composed by Harris Jayaraj, consists of seven tracks, with six tracks written by Thamarai and one song was written by Vignesh Shivan. Harris Jayaraj, for the first time he is composing for an Ajith Kumar-starrer film. The audio rights of the soundtrack album were marketed and purchased by Sony Music. Prior to the soundtrack release, a single track, titled "Adhaaru Adhaaru" from the film was released on 11 December 2014, and the complete soundtrack album in its entirety was released on 1 January 2015, coinciding with the New Year's Day and met with a positive critical reception, from critics  and music listeners praising Harris Jayaraj's musicianship, and the good composition for an Ajith-starrer film, and also its contribution for Gautham's reunion after Vaaranam Aayiram (2008).

Development 
The film's soundtrack album and background score were composed by Harris Jayaraj, the first time for a film starring Ajith Kumar. The soundtrack album consists of seven tracks. where six tracks written by Thamarai, and one song was written by Vignesh Shivan. In July 2014, Harris recorded a romantic song sung by Karthik. Harris said that he had recorded a fresh voice from the United Kingdom for the first song in the film, which was planned to be similar to "Karka Karka" from Menon's Vettaiyaadu Vilaiyaadu (2006). In August 2014, Harris started recording the third song for the film. On 18 September 2014, he updated that 3 songs were completed. It was also known that Trisha's character would have a solo song. "Adhaaru Adhaaru" is a mass action dappan-kuthu number, sung by Vijay Prakash and Gana Bala, with lyrics by Vignesh Shivan. Harris Jayaraj confirmed via Twitter that "Adhaaru Adhaaru" was a gangster song and not Ajith's introduction song in the film. Starting with the lively chorus, the song is ruled by powerful singing and peppy beats. The rhythm breakdowns in the interludes are meant to evoke thunderous response. A nice casual gaana. Harris Jayaraj was busy working on the final mix of the OST in early December 2014. It was confirmed that the score and the songs would be done in Dolby Atmos surround sound system.

Release 
In response to the request by Ajith's fans, the makers agreed to release a single track prior to the soundtrack release. The song "Adhaaru Adhaaru" which is a mass number, sung by Vijay Prakash and Gana Bala, the only song that did not feature lyrics by Thamarai but Vignesh Shivan, was released as the lead single on 11 December 2014. Within hours of its release the track topped the iTunes Indian songs chart. On YouTube, the single track got over 30 thousand hits in 24 hours and was liked by more than 7 thousand viewers. Initially, it was reported that Eros Music had snapped the audio rights of the film, but the audio rights were purchased by Sony Music. The tracklist of the album was released on 31 December 2014, and the complete soundtrack album was released on 1 January 2015, coinciding with the New Year's Day.

Track listing 
The tracklist was unveiled by Sony Music on 31 December 2014.

Reception 

The album met with positive critical reception from music critics. The Hindu stated that the music repeated the magic of his last collaboration with Gautham Menon, which was Vaaranam Aayiram. Behindwoods rated the album 3.25 out of 5 stars, with a verdict: "With huge expectations, Gautham Menon and Harris Jeyaraj avoid the tried and tested path and deliver an adventurous album. They are back!" Bollywoodlife rated the album 4 out of 5 stars, and reviewed it as "Harris Jayaraj comes up with a musical delight for Thala Ajith fans!" Sify rated the album 3.75 out of 5 stars, with a verdict: "The Gowtham-Harris combo is intact! A terrific album to start the year!" Indiaglitz rated the album 3/5, and reviewed it as "Gautham extracted the best of Harris, but it even that hasn't matched the expectations because of their past track record." MusicAloud, rated the album 7.5 out of 10.

Trivia 
The film marks Harris Jayaraj's reunion with Gautham Menon after six years. The last time they collaborated was for Vaaranam Aayiram (2008).

References 

2015 soundtrack albums
Harris Jayaraj albums
Sony Music India soundtracks
Tamil film soundtracks